Patricia Grossman is an American novelist. Born in Cleveland, Ohio in 1951, Grossman moved to New York City to attend Pratt Institute, where she studied drawing and painting. She has an M.F.A. in writing from Sarah Lawrence College and has published six novels, as well as two children's books.

Awards
In 2006, Grossman received the Ferro-Grumley Award for Brian in Three Seasons.

Published works
Inventions in a Grieving House (1990)
The Night Ones (1991)
Saturday Market (1994)
Four Figures in Time (1995)
Unexpected Child (2000)
Brian in Three Seasons (2005)
Looking for Heroes (2007)
Radiant Daughter (2010)

References

External links
Official website
Patricia Grossman at Poets & Writers

1951 births
Living people
Writers from Cleveland
20th-century American novelists
21st-century American novelists
American women novelists
American lesbian writers
American LGBT novelists
20th-century American women writers
21st-century American women writers
LGBT people from Ohio
Sarah Lawrence College alumni
Pratt Institute alumni
Novelists from Ohio